Illuminati Films is an Indian motion picture production, based in Mumbai. The company was founded in 2009 by Bollywood actor Saif Ali Khan and producer Dinesh Vijan, with its first release Love Aaj Kal (2009) becoming a major critical and commercial success.

History
The company's first release was marked by the romantic drama Love Aaj Kal, which released in 2009. Directed by Imtiaz Ali, the film portrays the feeling of pure love which never changes over time, although the perspective of realizing one's soulmate has changed. It received highly positive reviews by critics and became the second highest-grossing film of the year. Following Love Aaj Kal, Illuminati Films released its second project, Agent Vinod, an action thriller directed by Sriram Raghavan. Upon release, the film opened to mixed reviews and under-performed at the box office. Homi Adajania's Cocktail, which released on 13 July 2012, marked the production company's third project. The film received positive reviews and was a box office success. As of September, 2014, it was announced that Khan and Vijan had decided to mutually part ways, their last co-production being Raj & DK's Happy Ending. Khan now remains as the sole producer of the production house.

Filmography

References

Film production companies based in Mumbai
Hindi cinema
Indian companies established in 2009
Mass media companies established in 2009
Entertainment companies established in 2009
Saif Ali Khan